Zhang Liangqi (1923 – 9 July 2009) was a major general (shaojiang) of the People's Liberation Army (PLA) who served as president of the National University of Defense Technology from 1983 to 1990.

Biography
Zhang was born in Shanghai, in 1923, while his ancestral home in Wuxing County (now Wuxing District of Huzhou), Zhejiang. His father was an English teacher in Nanyang Model High School. He secondary studied at Nanyang Model High School. After graduating from Shanghai Jiao Tong University in 1946, he joined the faculty of Nanjing Naval Joint College. In 1958, he was transferred to the newly founded Harbin Institute of Military Engineering. He enlisted in the People's Liberation Army in 1960, and joined the Chinese Communist Party (CCP) in 1961. He was president of National University of Defense Technology in December 1983, and held that office until June 1990. He was promoted to the rank of major general (shaojiang) in 1988. On 9 July 2009, he died of an illness in Beijing, aged 86.

Personal life 
Zhang married Liu Duzhen in 1956.

References

1923 births
2009 deaths
People from Huzhou
National Chiao Tung University (Shanghai) alumni
Presidents of the National University of Defense Technology
People's Liberation Army generals from Zhejiang
People's Republic of China politicians from Jiangsu
Chinese Communist Party politicians from Jiangsu